The 2010 Arkansas gubernatorial election took place on Tuesday, November 2, 2010. Incumbent Democratic Governor Mike Beebe ran for re-election, and faced former State Senator Jim Keet, whom he defeated in a landslide to win a second and final term as governor, despite the year being a Republican midterm wave year and Democratic Senator Blanche Lincoln being unseated by a 21-point margin on the same ballot. Beebe's vote percentage was the highest of any Democratic gubernatorial candidate in the country that year.  

Candidates

Democratic Party
Mike Beebe, incumbent Governor

Republican Party
Jim Keet, former State Senator

Green Party
Jim Lendall, former State Representative and 2006 gubernatorial nominee

General election

Predictions

Polling

Results

References

External links
Elections at the Arkansas Secretary of State
Arkansas Governor Candidates at Project Vote Smart
Campaign contributions for 2010 Arkansas Governor from Follow the Money

Election 2010: Arkansas Governor from Rasmussen Reports
Arkansas Governor - Keet vs. Beebe from Real Clear Politics
2010 Arkansas Governor's Race from CQ Politics
Race Profile in The New York Times

Official campaign websites (archived)
Mike Beebe
Jim Keet

Gubernatorial
2010
2010 United States gubernatorial elections